Teemu Eino Antero Pukki (born 29 March 1990) is a Finnish professional footballer who plays as a striker for EFL Championship club Norwich City and the Finland national team.

Pukki began his career with KTP and made his debut on senior level on 23 June 2005 at the age of 15 in a fifth round match of the Finnish Cup. He then moved to Sevilla in 2008, where he played only one La Liga game for the first team before returning to Finland with HJK. In HJK he won the Veikkausliiga championship and the Finnish Cup. He then played in the top divisions of Germany for Schalke 04, Scotland for Celtic and Denmark for Brøndby. In 2018 he signed for Norwich City on a free transfer and was named player of the season in the 2018–19 EFL Championship.

Pukki made his international debut for Finland in 2009 and has earned over 100 caps, scoring 37 goals. He is the all-time leading Finnish goalscorer. Pukki scored ten goals in ten matches in Finland's UEFA Euro 2020 qualification campaign, helping the side reach their first ever international tournament.

Club career

KTP 
Pukki began his football career in childhood in HOPS (Hovinsaaren Palloseura) while living in Hovinsaari, Kotka. As a youth he joined his official hometown club, KTP, playing for their under-19 side. He made his debut for the first team at 16 years old and his performances saw him called up to play for Finland's youth international sides. In two seasons of first-team football, Pukki made 29 appearances in the Finnish Premier League (Veikkausliiga) and scored three goals.

Sevilla 
Pukki moved to Sevilla from KTP for a transfer fee of 180.000€. He was called up for the Sevilla first team for the away match against Real Madrid on 7 December 2008, but was an unused substitute. He received his La Liga debut at home against Racing on 25 January 2009. He found himself unused in Sevilla playing mostly for the reserve side Sevilla Atlético and he decided to return to Finland.

HJK 

On 28 August 2010, Pukki signed a three-and-half-year contract with the Finnish Veikkausliiga club HJK. Pukki made his debut 30 August a match against IFK Mariehamn. He managed to score his first goal for HJK in the next match against FF Jaro which was his first goal in a league match for nearly two years. During season 2010 he managed to play in seven games and score two goals for HJK in the 2010 season. At the end of the season HJK and Pukki won the Finnish Veikkausliiga and silver in the Finnish Cup.

During season 2011 he scored 11 goals and notched eight assists in 18 league matches out of which he was in the starting line up in 13. He was chosen to 2011 Veikkausliiga All Stars -team. Pukki was also a key figure in HJK's UEFA Champions League and UEFA Europa League qualifications. He scored two goals against Bangor City and HJK's both goals in a 2–0 home win against FC Schalke 04. Pukki also scored HJK's only goal in the 6–1 away defeat against Schalke.

Schalke 04 
On 31 August 2011, Pukki joined Schalke on a three-year contract. He made his debut on 18 September, when he came in as a substitute for Klaas-Jan Huntelaar on 66th minute in a 0–2 defeat against Bayern Munich. On 6 November, he scored two goals for Schalke as he debuted in the starting 11 against Hannover 96. By doing so, he became the third Finn to score a brace in the German Bundesliga, after Ari Hjelm and Pasi Rautiainen.

Celtic 
Pukki signed a four-year deal with Celtic from FC Schalke 04 for an undisclosed fee on 31 August 2013. He scored on his debut in a 3–1 win against Hearts on 14 September 2013 and again on his home debut against St Johnstone on 21 September. On 26 January 2014 he scored against Hibernian. Overall though, Pukki's first season at Celtic was considered something of a disappointment as he struggled with form and failed to fill the void left by Gary Hooper who had left at the start of the season. Pukki himself later acknowledged the lack of impact he had made, admitting he initially felt playing in Scotland would be "easier" than in Germany. He found the speed and physical nature of the game in Scotland difficult to adjust to, and stated "Scottish football is not easy. It’s not a bad league at all".

On 8 July 2014, Pukki scored his first Celtic hat trick in a pre-season friendly against LASK Linz in a 5–2 victory for Celtic. Pukki scored twice in Celtic's victory against KR Reykjavik at Murrayfield Stadium in Celtic's UEFA Champions League qualifying match, the match ended 4–0 with Celtic winning 5–0 on aggregate. However, he struggled to make any impact in the next qualifying round matches against Legia Warsaw and was substituted at half-time in the league defeat to Inverness Caledonian Thistle on 6 August 2014.

Brøndby 

On 1 September 2014, Pukki signed a one-year loan deal with option to buy with Danish side Brøndby IF. He made his debut 13 days later in a league match at home against Randers and scored his first goal two weeks later in a 2–2 draw away against Esbjerg. He went on to score another four goals in his next four games, and was rewarded for his form by being voted the Superliga Player of the Month for October, finishing the season as the club's top scorer, with nine goals. On 19 June 2015, Pukki signed a three-year contract with Brøndby for an undisclosed fee. On 4 August 2016, Pukki scored three goals when Brøndby knocked out Hertha BSC in the third round of the 2016–17 UEFA Europa League qualifiers, winning 3–1, thereby overcoming a 0–1 deficit from the first leg in Berlin.

On 13 July 2017, he scored one goal against VPS in the first leg of the second qualifying round for the 2017–18 UEFA Europa League, Brøndby would go on to win the match 2–0. On 10 May 2018 he played as Brøndby beat Silkeborg IF 3–1 in the 2017–18 Danish Cup final.

He was released at the end of the 2017–18 season after failing to agree a new deal with the club.

Norwich City

2018–19 season 
On 30 June 2018, Pukki joined EFL Championship club Norwich City on a free transfer, signing a three-year deal. He made his debut on 4 August, playing the full 90 minutes of a 2–2 draw at Birmingham City, and a week later he scored his first goal in a 4–3 home loss to West Bromwich Albion.

From January to February 2019, Pukki scored eight goals across six consecutive matches, ending with two goals in a 4–0 win at Bolton Wanderers. This run included two goals on 10 February in a 3–0 win over Ipswich Town in the East Anglian Derby, with which he became the Finn with the most goals in a Championship season, overtaking former Ipswich player Shefki Kuqi's 20 in 2004–05.

In April 2019, Pukki was named EFL Championship Player of the Season and was included in the 2018–19 Championship Team of the Season. He was also named Norwich City F.C. Player of the Season by Norwich City's supporters for 2018–19 and received the Barry Butler Memorial Trophy.

2019–20 season 

On 3 July 2019, Pukki signed a new three-year contract with the Premier League newcomers. On 9 August, he scored his first Premier League goal in a 4–1 away loss to Liverpool on the opening day of the new season. Eight days later, he scored a hat-trick against Newcastle United in a 3–1 victory, Norwich's first hat-trick in the Premier League since Efan Ekoku against Everton in September 1993. For the month of August he was named the Premier League Player of the Month, and the PFA Premier League Player of the Month. Pukki scored eleven Premier League goals in total for Norwich but was unable to prevent the Canaries from being relegated to the Championship.

2020–21 season 
Pukki remained at Norwich following their relegation to the Championship and scored his first goal of the season in a 2–2 draw with Preston North End at Carrow Road. Pukki continued his prolific form in the Championship and hit his fiftieth goal for the Canaries with a brace in a 2–1 win at Blackburn Rovers. Pukki was named Championship Player of the Month for February 2021, scoring seven goals in seven games. On 6 April 2021, he scored his first ever Championship hat-trick and his twenty-fifth goal of the season in a 7–0 thrashing of Huddersfield Town.

In April 2021, he was named on the EFL Team of the Season and nominated for the EFL Championship Player of the Season. The award was however won by his team mate Emiliano Buendía.

2021-22 season

Pukki scored his first goal of the season against Leicester from the penalty spot, in a 2-1 defeat. Pukki would also net his first goal of the season from open play against Watford. He scored in back to back wins for Norwich against Brentford and Southampton, the latter of which was the clubs first game under the management of Dean Smith. Over the course of the season, Pukki would net 11 goals and finish the season as Norwich's top goalscorer for 4th consecutive season. He would also be voted Norwich City's player of the season, however  once again Norwich City were relegated to the championship.

2022-23 season 
Despite being linked with moves away, Pukki remained at Norwich for the 2022/23 season. He netted his first goal of the season in a 3-0 win against Coventry. Pukki would net a brace a few days later in a 3-2 win against Bristol City. He would net the only goal of the match as Norwich beat Blackpool 1-0. Pukki would net a brace away to promotion chasing Sheffield United in a 2-2 draw, however would miss a late penalty. He would score his third brace of the season in a 4-0 away win against Preston North End, which was manager David Wagner's first game in charge of Norwich.

International career

Youth 

Pukki made his debut in international football on 10 August 2005 at the age 15 scoring both goals of the match for Finland U15 in a 0–2 away victory in Cardiff against Wales U15. In the Finland U21 Pukki made his debut at the age of 19 on 6 June 2009, in Tehtaan kenttä, Valkeakoski in a match against Belarus U21.

Senior 

Pukki debuted in the Finland national team on 4 February 2009 when Stuart Baxter used him as a substitute against Japan in a friendly match played in Tokyo. He scored his fifth goal for his country on 22 March 2013, scoring the equaliser as Finland recorded a 1–1 draw at reigning world and European champions Spain in World Cup qualifying.

In the 2018–19 UEFA Nations League, Finland won promotion from League C. Pukki scored the only goal of each of the Finns' first three matches, at home against Hungary and home and away to Estonia.

Pukki scored ten goals in the UEFA Euro 2020 qualifiers to help Finland to qualify for the first major tournament, UEFA Euro 2020, in their history.

Pukki was called up for the UEFA Euro 2020 pre-tournament friendly match against Sweden on 29 May 2021. Pukki played in all 3 international games at the UEFA Euro 2020 tournament. He failed to score in any of these matches however, and Finland was placed 3rd in Group B following a 2–0 defeat to Belgium on 21 June 2021. They were subsequently knocked out of the tournament.

On 12 October 2021, Pukki scored twice in a 2022 FIFA World Cup qualifier against Kazakhstan to overtake Jari Litmanen as the Finnish national team’s all-time top goalscorer.

Career statistics

Club

International 

Scores and results list Finland's goal tally first, score column indicates score after each Pukki goal.

Honours 
Sevilla Youth
Copa del Rey Juvenil de Fútbol: 2008

HJK
Veikkausliiga: 2010, 2011
Finnish Cup: 2011

Celtic
Scottish Premiership: 2013–14

Brøndby IF
Danish Cup: 2017–18

Norwich City
EFL Championship: 2018–19, 2020–21

Individual
Veikkausliiga All Stars: 2011
Danish Superliga Player of the Month: November 2014, August 2016
EFL Championship Player of the Season: 2018–19
EFL Team of the Season: 2018–19 2020–21
PFA Team of the Year: 2018–19 Championship, 2020–21 Championship
Norwich City Player of the Season: 2019, 2022
EFL Championship Golden Boot: 2018–19
Premier League Player of the Month: August 2019
Finnish Sports Personality of the Year: 2019
Finnish Footballer of the Year: 2019, 2020
EFL Championship Player of the Month: February 2021

See also 
 List of top international men's football goalscorers by country

References

Further reading

External links 

 Norwich City FC official profile
 Teemu Pukki – SPL competition record
 
 
 
 
 Career statistics at Football Finns

1990 births
Living people
People from Kotka
Finnish footballers
Association football forwards
FC KooTeePee players
Sevilla Atlético players
Sevilla FC players
Helsingin Jalkapalloklubi players
FC Schalke 04 players
Celtic F.C. players
Brøndby IF players
Norwich City F.C. players
Veikkausliiga players
Segunda División players
La Liga players
Bundesliga players
Scottish Professional Football League players
Danish Superliga players
English Football League players
Premier League players
Finland youth international footballers
Finland under-21 international footballers
Finland international footballers
UEFA Euro 2020 players
Finnish expatriate footballers
Finnish expatriate sportspeople in Spain
Finnish expatriate sportspeople in Germany
Finnish expatriate sportspeople in Scotland
Finnish expatriate sportspeople in Denmark
Finnish expatriate sportspeople in England
Expatriate footballers in Spain
Expatriate footballers in Germany
Expatriate footballers in Scotland
Expatriate men's footballers in Denmark
Expatriate footballers in England
FIFA Century Club
Sportspeople from Kymenlaakso